The Fokker M.16 was a full-gap (it had a deep fuselage that completely filled the interplane gap) single-engine, two-seat fighter/reconnaissance aircraft developed in 1915. It had a single 149 kW (200 hp) Austro-Daimler water-cooled inline engine. It was armed with two 7.92 mm (.312 in) machine guns.

The M.16E was the prototype for the M.16Z, which had either the Austro-Daimler or a 119 kW (160 hp) Mercedes engine.

The M.16E served in the Austrian-Hungarian Army as the Fokker B.III.

References

External links

1910s German fighter aircraft
M16
Single-engined tractor aircraft
Biplanes
Aircraft first flown in 1915